The Hawk Mountain Council serves over 8,000 young men and women in one of several Boy Scout programs in Berks, Schuylkill, and Carbon counties in Pennsylvania. The council has headquarters near Reading, PA. The Council was formed in 1970 with the merger of the Appalachian Trail and Daniel Boone councils.

Hawk Mountain Scout Reservation

Hawk Mountain Scout Reservation (HMSR) is the camp owned and operated by Hawk Mountain Council. It is located near Summit Station, Pennsylvania on Blue Mountain Road.  The reservation consists of Camp Meade for Boy Scouts and Camp DuPortail for Cub Scouts. The camp is open for tent and cabin camping year-round.

The property has  of forest and a man-made lake, known as Lake Nalaheman. The camp also offers two swimming pools, a COPE (Challenging Outdoor Personal Experience) Course, a climbing tower, and a confidence-building course for Cub Scouts. HMSR also maintains a shooting sports program in which participants are taught the safe and responsible use of firearms and archery; facilities include ranges for .22 caliber rifles and archery, as well as shotgun trap shooting, an action archery course, and sporting arrows. The Northeast Region's National Camp School is often held at the camp in early summer for one week.

Order of the Arrow
Kittatinny Lodge 5 is the Order of the Arrow lodge that serves the council. It was formed from the lodges of Appalachian Trail Council, Memeu 125, and Daniel Boone Council, Minsi 5, when the two councils merged in the 1970s.

See also
Scouting in Pennsylvania
Hawk Mountain Sanctuary
Hawk Mountain Ranger School

References

External links
Hawk Mountain Council
Hawk Mountain Scout Reservation
Patches of the Hawk Mountain Council

Local councils of the Boy Scouts of America
Youth organizations based in Pennsylvania
Northeast Region (Boy Scouts of America)
Youth organizations established in 1970
1970 establishments in Pennsylvania